"Love Me the Right Way" is a 1992 song by Italian record producers Charlie Mallozzi and Marco Sabiu as Rapination. It features vocals by American singer-songwriter Kym Mazelle and peaked at number 22 in the UK. The song also charted in Finland and Sweden. In 1996, a new remix was released and reached number 20 on the US Billboard Hot Dance Club Play chart.

Critical reception
Larry Flick from Billboard wrote, "Any opportunity to feast on the vocal prowess of Mazelle is well worth taking—even when the track she is given doesn't quite match her talent. The Rapino Brothers concoct a pleasing, but familiar Italo-house groove that benefits from the use of techno-influenced synth bits. A hit overseas, U.S. spinners may find the "Angelino Ambiento" mix intriguing."

Track listing

 7" single, UK (1992)
A. "Love Me the Right Way" (Gee & Professor 7" Mix) — 3:25
B. "Love Me the Right Way" (Gee & Professor Instrumental) — 3:25

 12", US (1992)
A1. "Love Me the Right Way" (The Real Rapino 12" Mix) — 5:48
A2. "Love Me the Right Way" (The Angelino Ambient Mix) — 5:19
A3. "Love Me the Right Way" (Gee And The Professor 7" Edit) — 3:25
B1. "Love Me the Right Way" (Angelino Tekniko Mix) — 4:43
B2. "Love Me the Right Way" (Happy Larry's Mix) — 5:29
B3. "Love Me the Right Way" (Lorenzo Mix) — 5:00

 12" maxi, Netherlands (1992)
A. "Love Me the Right Way" (The Real Rapino 12" Mix) — 5:48
B1. "Love Me the Right Way" (Angelino's Tekniko Mix) — 4:43
B2. "Love Me the Right Way" (Gee And The Professor 7" Mix) — 3:25

 CD single, UK & Europe (1992)
"Love Me the Right Way" (Gee And Professor 7" Mix) — 3:25
"Love Me the Right Way" (The Real Rapino 12" Mix) — 5:48
"Love Me the Right Way" (Angelino's Tekniko Mix) — 4:43
"Love Me the Right Way" (The Angelino Ambiento Mix) — 4:50

 CD single, UK (1996)
"Love Me the Right Way" (The Re Rapinoed Radio Edit) — 2:42
"Love Me the Right Way" (D.T.'s International Radio Edit) — 3:30
"Love Me the Right Way" (The Re Rapinoed Mix) — 5:25
"Love Me the Right Way" (D.T.'s International Mix) — 8:58
"Love Me the Right Way" (Kama's Love Mix) — 8:01
"Love Me the Right Way" (Alex Neri Up & Down Mix) — 8:32

Charts

Weekly charts

Year-end charts

References

 

 1992 singles
 1996 singles
 1992 songs
Arista Records singles
English-language Italian songs
House music songs
Logic Records singles
RCA Records singles